Durian Tunggal is a mukim and town in Alor Gajah District, Malacca, Malaysia, which is situated within the parliamentary constituency of Hang Tuah Jaya.

Education
 Universiti Teknikal Malaysia Melaka (Main campus)
 Skill-Tech Institute
 SMK Durian Tunggal (National High School)

Infrastructures

See also
 Alor Gajah District
 Hang Tuah Jaya

References

Mukims of Malacca